Sudbury Wolves could mean:

 Sudbury Wolves, a team in the Ontario Hockey League
 Sudbury Jr. Wolves, a team in the Northern Ontario Junior Hockey League
 Sudbury Wolves (EPHL), a defunct team in the Eastern Professional Hockey League